Drew Massey (born April 4, 1972) is an American voice actor, puppeteer and director for Nickelodeon and the Jim Henson Company. He has worked extensively with the Muppets and has performed in many films, television series, and commercials. He has also lent his voice to many commercials and video games.

Career
Drew Massey is the co-creator, co-writer, executive producer (with Mike Mitchell) and star of the Nickelodeon series The Barbarian and the Troll. Massey's film credits include The Happytime Murders (2018), Men in Black (1997), Dr. Dolittle (1998), Cats & Dogs (2001), Men in Black II (2002), The Muppets' Wizard of Oz (2005), and The Producers (2005). He has also performed on television in Earth to Ned, Greg the Bunny, Angel, Malcolm in the Middle, Muppets Tonight, Cousin Skeeter, Lost on Earth, and Crank Yankers; and in television advertisements for Foster Farms (as the driver chicken), Sony (the blue guy), and Levi's (as Flat Eric). In the Over the Hedge video game, Massey voiced Verne and other characters. In the Kung Fu Panda video games, he voiced Crane and other characters. In the Megamind video game, he voiced Minion and other characters. He is the star of The Sam Plenty Cavalcade of Action Show Plus Singing!, playing Sam Plenty. He is also a performer on No, You Shut Up and Spontaneanation with Paul F. Tompkins.

Massey directed six episodes of Splash and Bubbles for the Jim Henson Company, and over 50 shorts for the DreamworksTV/Peacock Kids YouTube channel featuring Kung Fu Panda, Puss In Boots, Shrek and Donkey, and King Julien.

Filmography
 The Barbarian and the Troll: Evan
 Earth to Ned: Cornelius’ eyes, Clods
 Sigmund and the Sea Monsters: Sigmund Ooze
 The Muppets Take the Bowl: Additional Muppet Performer, live show at the Hollywood Bowl, Sept. 8–10, 2017
 The Muppets Take the O2: Additional Muppet Performer, live show at the O2 Arena, Jul. 13–14, 2018
 Mutt & Stuff: Stuff, Davenport, Sid the tree
 Community: Puppet Abed
 Sid the Science Kid: Sid
 Neil's Puppet Dreams: Puppeteer
 Forgetting Sarah Marshall: Puppeteer Dracula
 The Darjeeling Limited: Puppeteer Tiger
 The Sam Plenty Cavalcade of Action Show Plus Singing!: Actor (Sam Plenty)
 Yo Gabba Gabba!: Puppeteer
 Crank Yankers: Puppeteer
 Robot Chicken: Voices (Fozzie Bear, Gonzo, Wembley Fraggle, Boober Fraggle, Emmet Otter, Ebenezer Scrooge)
 Greg the Bunny: Puppeteer (Count Blah and others)
 Angel: Puppet Angel
 Weezer's music video for "Keep Fishin'": Puppeteer
 Sesame Street: Various Muppets
 Statler and Waldorf: From the Balcony: Puppeteer (Statler)
 The Producers: Lead Puppeteer (pigeons)
 Men in Black: Worm Guy Sleeble
 The Puzzle Place: Kyle O'Connor
 Puppet Up!: Puppeteer
 The Happytime Murders: Goofer, Vinny
 Foster Farms Chickens: Actor (Driver Chicken)
 Over the Hedge: Verne
 Ryan's Mystery Playdate: Puppeteer
 Muppet Babies Play Date - Gonzo (baby) (puppeteer only)

External links
 
Article announcing Brendar the Barbarian (renamed The Barbarian and the Troll)
Under The Puppet podcast interview with Drew Massey
My First Time podcast
 Man or Muppet article from Scotland's Edinburgh Fringe Festival
 Interview with Drew Massey for the Mutant Season podcast

1964 births
Place of birth missing (living people)
Living people
American puppeteers
American stand-up comedians
American male voice actors
American male comedians
21st-century American comedians
Muppet performers
Sesame Street Muppeteers